The Overtake Award is an award introduced in 2021 Formula One season to reward the individual driver who makes the most overtakes throughout the season. It is currently named after crypto.com, one of the main sponsors of Formula One. 

For the  season, the award was modified: the amount of overtakes did not count anymore, instead the fans voted for the best overtake of each Grand Prix via social media. At the end of the season there was a social media poll to determine the overall winner. The award was modified for the  season: fans can select from a shortlist of the best on-track action every month and vote for their favourite overtake. At the end of the season, all winners are voted to decide the definitive on-track move of the season.

Chronology of Overtake Awards

Notes

References

Formula One
Auto racing trophies and awards